Thomas Cruise Mapother IV (born July 3, 1962) is an American actor and producer. One of the world's highest-paid actors, he has received various accolades, including an Honorary Palme d'Or and three Golden Globe Awards, in addition to nominations for four Academy Awards.

Cruise began acting in the early 1980s and made his breakthrough with leading roles in the comedy film Risky Business (1983) and action film Top Gun (1986). Critical acclaim came with his roles in the dramas The Color of Money (1986), Rain Man (1988), and Born on the Fourth of July (1989). For his portrayal of Ron Kovic in the latter, he won a Golden Globe Award and received a nomination for the Academy Award for Best Actor. As a leading Hollywood star in the 1990s, he starred in several commercially successful films, including the drama A Few Good Men (1992), the thriller The Firm (1993), the horror film Interview with the Vampire (1994), and the romance Jerry Maguire (1996). For the latter, he won a Golden Globe Award for Best Actor and received his second Academy Award nomination. Cruise's performance as a motivational speaker in the drama Magnolia (1999) earned him another Golden Globe Award and a nomination for the Academy Award for Best Supporting Actor.

Since then, Cruise has largely starred in science fiction and action films, establishing himself as an action star, often performing his own risky stunts. He has played Ethan Hunt in all six of the Mission: Impossible films from 1996 to 2018. His other notable roles in the genre include Vanilla Sky (2001), Minority Report (2002), The Last Samurai (2003), Collateral (2004), War of the Worlds (2005), Knight and Day (2010), Jack Reacher (2012), Oblivion (2013), Edge of Tomorrow (2014), and Top Gun: Maverick (2022), with Maverick being his highest-grossing film.

Cruise has been married to actresses Mimi Rogers, Nicole Kidman, and Katie Holmes. He has three children, two of whom were adopted during his marriage to Kidman and the other of whom is a biological daughter he had with Holmes. 

Cruise is an outspoken advocate for the Church of Scientology, which he credits with helping him overcome dyslexia. In the 2000s, he sparked controversy with his criticisms of psychiatry and anti-depressant drugs, his efforts to promote Scientology in Europe, and a leaked video interview of him promoting Scientology. Cruise has been a close friend of Church of Scientology leader David Miscavige since the 1980s.

Early life and education
Cruise was born on July 3, 1962, in Syracuse, New York, to electrical engineer Thomas Cruise Mapother III (1934–1984) and special education teacher Mary Lee (née Pfeiffer; 1936–2017). His parents were both from Louisville, Kentucky, and had English, German, and Irish ancestry. Cruise has three sisters named Lee Anne, Marian, and Cass. One of his cousins, William Mapother, is also an actor who has appeared alongside Cruise in five films. Cruise grew up in near poverty and had a Catholic upbringing. He later described his father as "a merchant of chaos", a "bully", and a "coward" who beat his children. He elaborated, "[My father] was the kind of person where, if something goes wrong, they kick you. It was a great lesson in my life—how he'd lull you in, make you feel safe and then, bang! For me, it was like, 'There's something wrong with this guy. Don't trust him. Be careful around him.

In total, Cruise attended 15 schools in 14 years. Cruise spent part of his childhood in Canada; when his father took a job as a defense consultant with the Canadian Armed Forces, his family moved in late 1971 to Beacon Hill, Ottawa. He attended the new Robert Hopkins Public School for his fourth and fifth grade education. He first became involved in drama in fourth grade, under drama teacher George Steinburg. He and six other boys put on an improvised play to music called IT at the Carleton Elementary School drama festival. Drama organizer Val Wright was in the audience and later said that "the movement and improvisation were excellent ... a classic ensemble piece." In sixth grade, Cruise went to Henry Munro Middle School in Ottawa. That year, his mother left his father, taking Cruise and his sisters back to the United States. In 1978, she married Jack South. 
Cruise briefly took a Catholic Church scholarship and attended the St. Francis Seminary in Cincinnati, Ohio; he aspired to become a Franciscan priest before leaving after a year. Priests at the seminary have said Cruise chose to leave the school when his family relocated again, however a fellow classmate alleges they both asked to leave after getting caught taking liquor. In his senior year of high school, he played football for the varsity team as a linebacker, but was cut from the squad after getting caught drinking beer before a game. He went on to star in the school's production of Guys and Dolls. In 1980, he graduated from Glen Ridge High School in Glen Ridge, New Jersey.

Cruise's biological father died of cancer in 1984.

Acting career

1980s 
At age 18, with the blessing of his mother and stepfather, Cruise moved to New York City to pursue an acting career. After working as a busboy in New York, he went to Los Angeles to try out for television roles. He signed with CAA and began acting in films. He first appeared in a bit part in the 1981 film Endless Love, followed by a major supporting role as a crazed military academy student in Taps later that year. In 1983, Cruise was part of the ensemble cast of The Outsiders. That same year he appeared in All the Right Moves and Risky Business, which has been described as "A Generation X classic, and a career maker for Tom Cruise." He also played the male lead in the Ridley Scott film Legend, released in 1985. By 1986's Top Gun, his status as a superstar had been cemented.

Cruise followed up Top Gun with Martin Scorsese's The Color of Money (1986), which came out the same year, and which paired him with Paul Newman. Their chemistry won praise among critics with The Washington Post writing, "One of the subtle achievements of both Cruise's and Newman's performances is that you feel that both of them are genuinely top-notch pool hustlers". In 1988, Cruise starred in Cocktail, a film that was a box office success but failed with critics. His performance earned him a nomination for the Razzie Award for Worst Actor. Later that year he starred with Dustin Hoffman in Barry Levinson's Rain Man, which won the Academy Award for Best Film and Cruise the Kansas City Film Critics Circle Award for Best Supporting Actor.

In 1989, Cruise portrayed real-life paralyzed Vietnam War veteran Ron Kovic in Oliver Stone's war epic Born on the Fourth of July. Film critic Roger Ebert of the Chicago Sun-Times wrote, "Nothing Cruise has done will prepare you for what he does in Born on the Fourth of July ... His performance is so good that the movie lives through it. Stone is able to make his statement with Cruise's face and voice and doesn't need to put everything into the dialogue." The performance earned him a Golden Globe Award for Best Actor –  Motion Picture Drama, the Chicago Film Critics Association Award for Best Actor, the People's Choice Award for Favorite Motion Picture Actor, a nomination for BAFTA Award for Best Actor in a Leading Role, and Cruise's first Best Actor Academy Award nomination.

1990s 
Cruise's next films were Days of Thunder (1990) and Far and Away (1992), both of which co-starred then-wife Nicole Kidman as his love interest, followed by the legal thriller The Firm, which was a critical and commercial success. In 1994, Cruise starred along with Brad Pitt, Antonio Banderas and Christian Slater in Neil Jordan's Interview with the Vampire, a gothic drama/horror film that was based on Anne Rice's best-selling novel. The film was well-received, although Rice was initially quite outspoken in her criticism of Cruise having been cast in the film, as Julian Sands was her first choice. Upon seeing the film, however, she paid $7,740 for a two-page ad in Daily Variety praising his performance and apologizing for her previous doubts about him.

In 1996, Cruise appeared as superspy Ethan Hunt in the reboot of Mission: Impossible, which he produced. The film was directed by Brian De Palma and was a box office success, although it received criticism regarding the Jim Phelps character being a villain despite being a protagonist of the original television series. Film critic Stephen Holden of The New York Times praised Cruise's performance, declaring "Tom Cruise has found the perfect superhero character on which to graft his breathlessly gung-ho screen personality." In the same year, Cruise took on the title role in Cameron Crowe's sports drama Jerry Maguire playing a sports agent in search of love. He stars opposite Renee Zellweger, and Cuba Gooding Jr. The film was a massive financial success with Cruise earning a Golden Globe Award for Best Actor – Motion Picture Musical or Comedy and his second nomination for an Academy Award for Best Actor.

In 1999, Cruise costarred with Kidman in Stanley Kubrick's erotic and psychological drama film Eyes Wide Shut. Peter Bradshaw of The Guardian praised both Cruise and Kidman on their performances writing, "Cruise in particular lays himself open in that fiercely committed way that he tries everything as an actor". That same year he took a rare supporting role, as a motivational speaker, Frank T.J. Mackey, in Paul Thomas Anderson's Magnolia (1999). Rolling Stone film critic Peter Travers heaped praise on Cruise writing, "Cruise is a revelation, fully deserving of the shower of superlatives coming his way ... Cruise seethes with the chaotic energy of a wounded animal – he's devastating." For his performance he received another Golden Globe and nomination for an Academy Award.

2000s 
In 2000, Cruise returned as Ethan Hunt in the second installment of the Mission Impossible films, Mission: Impossible 2. The film was helmed by Hong Kong director John Woo and branded with his gun fu style; it continued the series' success at the box office, taking in $547 million worldwide. Unlike its predecessor, it was the highest-grossing film of the year and had a mixed critical reception. Cruise received an MTV Movie Award for Best Male Performance for the film.

His next five films were major critical and commercial successes. The following year, Cruise starred in the romantic thriller Vanilla Sky (2001) with Cameron Diaz and Penélope Cruz. In 2002, Cruise starred in the dystopian science fiction action film Minority Report, which was directed by Steven Spielberg and based on the science fiction short story by Philip K. Dick.

In 2003, he starred in Edward Zwick's period action drama The Last Samurai, for which he received a Golden Globe nomination for best actor. In 2004, Cruise received critical acclaim for his performance as Vincent in Collateral. The critical consensus states that "Driven by director Michael Mann's trademark visuals and a lean, villainous performance from Tom Cruise, Collateral is a stylish and compelling noir thriller." In 2005, Cruise worked again with Steven Spielberg in War of the Worlds, a loose adaptation of the H. G. Wells novel of the same name, which became the fourth highest-grossing film of the year with US$591.4 million worldwide. Also in 2005, he was a nominee for the People's Choice Award for Favorite Male Movie Star and the winner of the MTV Generation Award. Cruise was nominated for seven Saturn Awards between 2002 and 2009, winning once. Nine of the ten films he starred in during the decade made over $100 million at the box office.

In 2006, he returned to his role as Ethan Hunt in the third installment of the Mission Impossible film series, Mission: Impossible III. The film was more positively received by critics than the previous films in the series, and grossed nearly $400 million at the box office. In 2007, Cruise took a rare supporting role for the second time in Lions for Lambs, which was a commercial disappointment. This was followed by an unrecognizable appearance as "Les Grossman" in the 2008 comedy Tropic Thunder with Ben Stiller, Jack Black, and Robert Downey Jr. This performance earned Cruise a Golden Globe nomination. Cruise played the central role in the historical thriller Valkyrie released on December 25, 2008, to box office success.

2010s 
In March 2010, Cruise completed filming the action-comedy Knight and Day, in which he re-teamed with former costar Cameron Diaz; the film was released on June 23, 2010. On February 9, 2010, Cruise confirmed that he would star in Mission: Impossible – Ghost Protocol, the fourth installment in the Mission: Impossible series. The film was released in December 2011 to high critical acclaim and box office success. Unadjusted for ticket price inflation, it was Cruise's biggest commercial success to that date.

On May 6, 2011, Cruise was awarded a humanitarian award from the Simon Wiesenthal Center and its Museum of Tolerance for his work as a dedicated philanthropist. In mid-2011, Cruise started shooting the movie Rock of Ages (2012), in which he played the fictional character Stacee Jaxx. The film was released in June 2012 and was a rare box-office misstep for Cruise. Cruise however received positive reviews for his performance with Variety film critic Justin Chang writing, "Channeling the likes of Axl Rose and Keith Richards with his tattoos, heavy furs and even heavier eyeshadow, Cruise clearly relishes the opportunity to play against type even as he sends up his world's-biggest-movie-star identity, displaying a cock-of-the-rock strut that viewers haven't seen since his turn in Magnolia."

Cruise starred as Jack Reacher in the film adaptation of British author Lee Child's 2005 novel One Shot. The film was released on December 21, 2012. It met with positive reviews from critics and was a box office success grossing $217 million worldwide. In 2013, he starred in the science fiction film Oblivion based on director Joseph Kosinski's graphic novel of the same name. The film met with mixed reviews and grossed $286 million worldwide. It also starred Morgan Freeman and Olga Kurylenko. In 2014, Cruise starred in the science fiction-action film Edge of Tomorrow, which received positive reviews and grossed over $370 million.

In 2015, Cruise returned as Ethan Hunt in the fifth installment of the Mission: Impossible series, Mission: Impossible – Rogue Nation, which he also produced. Returning cast members included Simon Pegg as Benji and Jeremy Renner as William Brandt, with Christopher McQuarrie as director. The film earned high critical acclaim and was a commercial success. Cruise starred in the 2017 reboot of Boris Karloff's 1932 horror movie The Mummy. The new film, also titled The Mummy received negative reviews and flopped at the box office. In 2018, Cruise again reprised Ethan Hunt, in the sixth film in his franchise, Mission: Impossible – Fallout. The film was more positively received by critics than the previous films in the series, and grossed over $791 million at the box office. Unadjusted for ticket price inflation, it was Cruise's biggest commercial success to date.

2020s 
In May 2020, it was reported that Cruise would be starring in and producing a movie shot in outer space. Doug Liman would be directing, writing, and co-producing. Both will fly to the International Space Station as part of a future Axiom Space mission in a SpaceX Dragon 2 spacecraft.

In May 2021, Cruise protested against the Hollywood Foreign Press Association (HFPA) by returning all three of his Golden Globe Awards in light of controversy surrounding the HFPA, particularly its lack of diversity, specifically no black members, and ethical questions related to financial benefits to some of its members.

In 2022, Cruise reprised his role as Captain Pete "Maverick" Mitchell in Top Gun: Maverick, a film which he also executive produced. The film premiered at the Cannes Film Festival where Cruise earned an Honorary Palme d'Or. The film was released to widespread critical praise, with many reviewers deeming it superior to its predecessor. The film broke several box office records upon its release; earning over $1 billion, becoming the highest-grossing film of his career. Cruise earned $100 million for the film, when combining ticket sales, his salary, and his cut of home entertainment rentals and streaming revenues.

Production
Cruise partnered with his former talent agent Paula Wagner to form Cruise/Wagner Productions in 1993, and the company has since co-produced several of Cruise's films, the first being Mission: Impossible in 1996 which was also Cruise's first project as a producer.

Cruise is noted as having negotiated some of the most lucrative film deals in Hollywood, and was described in 2005 by Hollywood economist Edward Jay Epstein as "one of the most powerful – and richest – forces in Hollywood." Epstein argues that Cruise is one of the few producers (the others being George Lucas, Steven Spielberg and Jerry Bruckheimer) who are regarded as able to guarantee the success of a billion-dollar film franchise. Epstein also contends that the public obsession with Cruise's tabloid controversies obscures full appreciation of Cruise's exceptional commercial prowess.

Cruise/Wagner Productions, Cruise's film production company, is said to be developing a screenplay based on Erik Larson's New York Times bestseller The Devil in the White City about a real-life serial killer, H. H. Holmes, at Chicago's World's Columbian Exposition. Kathryn Bigelow is attached to the project to produce and helm. Meanwhile, Leonardo DiCaprio's production company, Appian Way, is also developing a film about Holmes and the World's Fair, in which DiCaprio will star.

Cruise has produced several films in which he appeared. He produced Mission: Impossible, Without Limits, Mission: Impossible 2, The Others, Vanilla Sky and many others.

Break with Paramount
On August 22, 2006, Paramount Pictures announced it was ending its 14-year relationship with Cruise. In The Wall Street Journal, chairman of Viacom (Paramount's parent company) Sumner Redstone cited the economic damage to Cruise's value as an actor and producer from his controversial public behavior and views. Cruise/Wagner Productions responded that Paramount's announcement was a face-saving move after the production company had successfully sought alternative financing from private equity firms.

Industry analysts such as Edward Jay Epstein commented that the real reason for the split was most likely Paramount's discontent over Cruise/Wagner's exceptionally large share of DVD sales from the Mission: Impossible franchise.

Management of United Artists
In November 2006, Cruise and Paula Wagner announced that they had taken over the film studio United Artists. Cruise acts as a producer and star in films for United Artists, while Wagner serves as UA's chief executive.

Production began in 2007 of Valkyrie, a thriller based on the July 20, 1944, assassination attempt against Adolf Hitler. The film was acquired in March 2007 by United Artists. On March 21, 2007, Cruise signed to play Claus von Stauffenberg, the protagonist. This project marked the second production to be greenlighted since Cruise and Wagner took control of United Artists. The first was its inaugural film, Lions for Lambs, directed by Robert Redford and starring Redford, Meryl Streep and Cruise. Lambs was released on November 9, 2007, opening to unimpressive box office revenue and critical reception.

In August 2008, Wagner stepped down from her position at United Artists; she retains her stake in UA, which combined with Cruise's share amounts to 30 percent of the studio.

Personal life

Relationships

Cruise splits his time between homes in Beverly Hills, California; Clearwater, Florida; and the South of England where Cruise has lived in various places including Central London, Dulwich, East Grinstead, and Biggin Hill.

In the early-to-mid-1980s, Cruise had relationships with Melissa Gilbert, Rebecca De Mornay, Patti Scialfa, and Cher.

Cruise married actress Mimi Rogers on May 9, 1987. They divorced on February 4, 1990. Rogers had grown up in Scientology and was one of its 'auditors'; they met when Cruise became one of her clients. After she left the organization, she blamed its leader, David Miscavige, for the break-up of their marriage.

Cruise met his second wife, actress Nicole Kidman, on the set of their film Days of Thunder (1990). The couple married on December 24, 1990. They adopted two children: Isabella Jane (born 1992) and Connor Antony (born 1995). In February 2001, Cruise filed for divorce from Kidman while she was unknowingly pregnant. The pregnancy seemingly ended in a miscarriage, but in 2007, Kidman clarified the rumors by explaining that she had actually had an ectopic pregnancy.

Cruise was next romantically linked with Penélope Cruz, his co-star in Vanilla Sky (2001). Their three-year relationship ended in 2004. An article in the October 2012 issue of Vanity Fair stated that several sources have said that after the breakup with Cruz, Scientologist leaders launched a secret project to find Cruise a new girlfriend. According to those sources, a series of "auditions" of Scientologist actresses resulted in a short-lived relationship with Iranian-British actress Nazanin Boniadi, who subsequently left Scientology. Scientology and Cruise's lawyers issued strongly worded denials and threatened to sue, accusing Vanity Fair of "shoddy journalism" and "religious bigotry". Journalist Roger Friedman later reported that he received an email from director and ex-Scientologist Paul Haggis confirming the story.

In April 2005, Cruise began dating actress Katie Holmes. On April 27 that year, Cruise and Holmes—dubbed TomKat by the media—made their first public appearance together in Rome. A month later, Cruise publicly declared his love for Holmes on The Oprah Winfrey Show; he jumped on Winfrey's yellow couch and stood there. Media coverage at the time implied that Oprah was somewhat taken aback by Cruise's outburst, which distracted from the intended promotion of Cruise's current film, War of the Worlds. On October 6, 2005, Cruise and Holmes announced they were expecting a child. In April 2006, their daughter Suri was born. On November 18, Holmes and Cruise were married at the 15th-century Odescalchi Castle in Bracciano, in a Scientologist ceremony attended by many Hollywood stars. Their publicists said the couple had "officialized" their marriage in Los Angeles the day before the Italian ceremony. There has been widespread speculation that their marriage was arranged by the Church of Scientology. David Miscavige, the head of Scientology, served as Cruise's best man. On June 29, 2012, Holmes filed for divorce from Cruise. On July 9, the couple signed a divorce settlement worked out by their lawyers. New York law requires all divorce documents remain sealed, so the exact terms of the settlement are not publicly available. Cruise stated that ex-wife Katie Holmes divorced him in part to protect the couple's daughter Suri from Scientology and that Suri is no longer a practicing member of the organization.

Scientology
Cruise was converted to Scientology by his first wife Mimi Rogers in 1986, becoming an outspoken advocate for the Church of Scientology in the 2000s. His involvement in the organization was leaked by the tabloid Star in 1990, and he publicly admitted to following Scientology in a 1992 interview with Barbara Walters. According to the book Inside Scientology: The Story of America's Most Secretive Religion by Janet Reitman, seven years after Cruise started studying Scientology, the organization's leaders promised to share Scientology secrets, such as the prophet Xenu. According to Reitman's book, Cruise "freaked out" and took a step back. He removed himself from the Church and worked on the film Eyes Wide Shut until 1999 when David Miscavige sent Marty Rathbun to successfully "retrieve" Cruise and convince him to continue training. Cruise had become a full-on zealot after a couple of years. Cruise is friends with the Scientology organization's chairman David Miscavige. Cruise struggled with dyslexia at an early age and has said that Scientology, specifically the L. Ron Hubbard Study Tech, helped him overcome dyslexia.

Advocacy 
In addition to promoting various programs that introduce people to Scientology, Cruise has campaigned for Scientology to be afforded the status of a religion in Europe. In 2005, the Council of Paris revealed that Cruise had lobbied French Interior Minister Nicolas Sarkozy and Senate President Jean-Claude Gaudin. They described him as a militant spokesman for Scientology, and barred any further dealings with him. He lobbied British Prime Minister Tony Blair to recognize the Scientology organization as a tax-exempt nonprofit organization in the United Kingdom. In the United States, he convinced Bush administration officials Deputy Secretary of State Richard Armitage and Vice Presidential Chief of Staff Scooter Libby to oppose the non-recognition of Scientology in Germany in 2003. In 2004, he met Secretary of Education Rod Paige about endorsing Scientologist education methods as part of No Child Left Behind.

Cruise co-founded and raised donations for Downtown Medical to offer New York City 9/11 rescue workers detoxification therapy based on the works of L. Ron Hubbard. This drew criticism from medical professionals and firefighters. For such activities, Scientology leader David Miscavige created the Scientology Freedom Medal of Valor and awarded it to Cruise in late 2004. Former Scientologist Paul Haggis also claimed that Cruise attempted to convert celebrities such as James Packer, Victoria and David Beckham, Jada Pinkett and Will Smith, and Steven Spielberg to Scientology.

Controversies

Criticism of psychiatry 

In January 2004, Cruise made the controversial statement: "I think psychiatry should be outlawed." Further controversy ensued in 2005, when he criticized actress Brooke Shields for using the drug Paxil (paroxetine), an antidepressant which she used to recover from postpartum depression after the birth of her first daughter in 2003. Cruise asserted that there is no such thing as a chemical imbalance and that psychiatry is a form of pseudoscience. In response, Shields argued that Cruise "should stick to saving the world from aliens and let women who are experiencing postpartum depression decide what treatment options are best for them." This led to a heated argument between Cruise and Matt Lauer on NBC's Today on June 24, 2005.

Medical authorities view Cruise's comments as furthering the social stigma of mental illness. From The Lancet, "He may be right that psychotropic drugs are overused, sometimes misused; and that lifestyle changes (and exercise for depression) can be helpful. But he is wrong, as a celebrity, to add to the burden of those with a mental illness, who often fear seeking or continuing treatment because of the stigma still attached to their condition." Shields called Cruise's comments "a disservice to mothers everywhere." In late August 2006, Cruise apologized in person to Shields for his comments.

Scientology is well known for its opposition to mainstream psychiatry and psychoactive drugs that are routinely prescribed for treatment. It was reported that Cruise's anti-psychiatry actions led to a rift with director Steven Spielberg. Spielberg had reportedly mentioned in Cruise's presence the name of a doctor friend who prescribed psychiatric medication. Shortly thereafter, the doctor's office was picketed by Scientologists, reportedly angering Spielberg.

YouTube video removal 

On January 15, 2008, a video produced by the Church of Scientology featuring an interview with Cruise was posted on YouTube by the Anonymous-linked group Project Chanology, showing Cruise discussing what being a Scientologist means to him. The Church of Scientology said the video had been "pirated and edited", and was taken from a three-hour video produced for members of Scientology. YouTube removed the Cruise video from their site under threat of litigation.

After YouTube investigated this claim, they found that the video did not breach copyright law, as it is covered by the fair use clause. It was subsequently reinstated on the site, and as of June 2020, the video has achieved over 15 million views. YouTube has declined to remove it again, due to the popularity of the video, and subsequent changes to copyright policy of the website.

Purported influence 

In March 2004, his publicist of 14 years, Pat Kingsley, resigned. Cruise's next publicist was Lee Anne DeVette, his sister, who was herself a Scientologist. She served in that role until November 2005. DeVette was replaced with Paul Bloch from the publicity firm Rogers and Cowan. Such restructuring was seen as a move to curtail publicity of his views on Scientology, as well as the controversy surrounding his relationship with Katie Holmes.

Lawrence Wright's 2013 book Going Clear: Scientology and the Prison of Belief and Alex Gibney's 2015 television documentary adaptation of the same name cast a spotlight on Cruise's role in Scientology. The book and the film both allege that the Scientology organization groomed romantic partners for Cruise and that Cruise used Sea Org and Rehabilitation Project Force workers as a source of free labor. In the film, Cruise's former auditor Marty Rathbun claims that wife Nicole Kidman was wiretapped on Cruise's suggestion, which Cruise's lawyer denies. Cruise's ex-girlfriend Nazanin Boniadi later compared the Scientology organization's auditioning of women to date Cruise and experiences with him to "white slavery."

Filmography

Awards and legacy

In 2006, Premiere ranked Cruise as Hollywood's most powerful actor, as Cruise came in at number 13 on the magazine's 2006 Power List, being the highest ranked actor. The same year, Forbes magazine ranked him as the world's most powerful celebrity. The founder of CinemaScore in 2016 cited Cruise and Leonardo DiCaprio as the "two stars, it doesn't matter how bad the film is, they can pull [the box office] up."

October 10, 2006, was declared "Tom Cruise Day" in Japan; the Japan Memorial Day Association said that he was awarded with a special day because of "his love for and close association with Japan."

While reviewing Days of Thunder, film critic Roger Ebert noted the similarities between several of Cruise's 1980s films and nicknamed the formula the "Tom Cruise Picture". Ebert listed nine key ingredients that make up the Tom Cruise Picture: the Cruise character, the mentor, the superior woman, the craft he must hone, the arena it takes place in, the arcana or knowledge he must learn, the trail or journey, the proto enemy, and the eventual enemy of the character. Some of Cruise's later films like A Few Good Men and The Last Samurai can also be considered to be part of this formula.

Widescreenings compares two of these Cruise characters in an article on the film A Few Good Men,

Cruise is an aerobatic pilot, and was inducted as part of the Living Legends of Aviation in 2010, receiving the Aviation Inspiration and Patriotism Award from the Kiddie Hawk Air Academy. In addition to other aircraft, Cruise owns a P-51 Mustang.

Litigation
In 1998, Cruise successfully sued the Daily Express, a British tabloid which alleged that his marriage to Kidman was a sham designed to cover up his homosexuality.

In May 2001, Cruise filed a lawsuit against gay porn actor Chad Slater. Slater had told the celebrity magazine Actustar that he had been involved in an affair with Cruise. This claim was strongly denied by Cruise, and Slater was later ordered to pay $10 million to Cruise in damages after Slater declared he could not afford to defend himself against the suit and would therefore default. Cruise requested a default judgment and, in January 2003, a Los Angeles judge decided against Slater after the porn actor said that his story was false.

Cruise also sued Bold Magazine publisher Michael Davis for $100 million, because Davis had alleged (though never confirmed) that he had video that would prove Cruise was gay. The suit was dropped in exchange for a public statement by Davis that the video was not of Cruise, and that Cruise was heterosexual.

In 2006, Cruise sued cybersquatter Jeff Burgar to obtain control of the TomCruise.com domain name. When owned by Burgar, the domain redirected to information about Cruise on Celebrity1000.com. The decision to turn TomCruise.com over to Cruise was handed down by the World Intellectual Property Organization (WIPO) on July 5, 2006.

In 2009, Michael Davis Sapir filed a suit charging that his phone had been wiretapped at Cruise's behest. That suit was dismissed by a Central Civil West court judge in Los Angeles on the grounds that the statute of limitations had expired on Sapir's claim.

In October 2012, Cruise filed a lawsuit against In Touch and Life & Style magazines for defamation after they claimed Cruise had "abandoned" his six-year-old daughter. During deposition, Cruise testified that due to his work load 110 days had passed without his seeing her. The suit was ultimately settled between the two parties.

See also
 Tom Cruise: Unauthorized (1998)
 Tom Cruise: All the World's a Stage (2006)
 Tom Cruise: An Unauthorized Biography (2008)
 Tom Cruise Purple
 Miles Fisher, American actor and notable Cruise impersonator
 Rock of Ages soundtrack (2012)
 Supercouple

References

External links

 
 
 
 
 
 Tom Cruise on Yahoo! Movies
 Tom Cruise on WorldCat (libraries)

 
1962 births
20th-century American male actors
21st-century American male actors
American aviators
American expatriates in Canada
American film producers
American male film actors
American people of English descent
American people of German descent
American people of Irish descent
American people with disabilities
American Scientologists
Best Drama Actor Golden Globe (film) winners
Best Musical or Comedy Actor Golden Globe (film) winners
Best Supporting Actor Golden Globe (film) winners
Converts to Scientology from Roman Catholicism
David di Donatello Career Award winners
Film producers from New Jersey
Film producers from New York (state)
Glen Ridge High School alumni
Living people
Male actors from New Jersey
Male actors from New York (state)
Male actors from Ottawa
Male actors from Syracuse, New York
People from Glen Ridge, New Jersey
People from Syracuse, New York
Scientology and psychiatry
Skydance Media people
Actors with dyslexia